is a Japanese Nippon Professional Baseball pitcher. He is currently with the Tohoku Rakuten Golden Eagles in Japan's Pacific League.

External links

NPB stats

1985 births
Living people
Asian Games medalists in baseball
Asian Games silver medalists for Japan
Baseball players at the 2006 Asian Games
Japanese baseball players
Medalists at the 2006 Asian Games
Nippon Professional Baseball pitchers
Baseball people from Gifu Prefecture
Tohoku Rakuten Golden Eagles players
Aichi Institute of Technology alumni